Togolese Rugby Federation is the governing body for rugby union in Togo. It is a member of the Confederation of African Rugby (CAR) and the International Rugby Board.

References

Togo
Rugby union in Togo